Heidemarie Hatheyer (8 April 1918 – 11 May 1990) was an Austrian film actress. She appeared in 43 films between 1938 and 1988.

Filmography

The Mountain Calls (1938) - Felicitas
 Frau Sixta (1938) - Anna, Kellnerin
 Zwischen Strom und Steppe (1939) - Maria
 Ein ganzer Kerl (1939) - Jule
 The Vulture Wally (1940) - Wally Fender, die "Geierwally"
 Ich klage an (1941) - Hanna Heyt
 Die Nacht in Venedig (1942) - Annemarie Pleß, Stenotypistin
 Der große Schatten (1942) - Gisela Ahrens
 Man rede mir nicht von Liebe (1943) - Pamela Keith
 Axel an der Himmelstür (1944)
 The Years Pass (1945) - Frau Irene Behrendsen
 Where the Trains Go (1949) - Fanny Förster
 Encounter with Werther (1949) - Lotte
 This Man Belongs to Me (1950) - Fita Busse
 Mathilde Möhring (1950) - Mathilde Möhring
 Regimental Music (1950) - Gabriele von Wahl
 The Man Who Wanted to Live Twice (1950) - Maria Monnard
 Chased by the Devil (1950) - Maria Hendrix
 Dr. Holl (1951) - Helga Roemer
 Desires (1952) - Anna Falkner
 Don't Ask My Heart (1952) - Anna Lohmann
 Anna Louise and Anton (1953) - Frau Gast - Antons Mutter
 Sauerbruch – Das war mein Leben (1954) - Olga Ahrends
 Love Without Illusions (1955) - Christa
 Die Ratten (1955) - Anna John
 You Can No Longer Remain Silent (1955) - Salvör
 The Marriage of Doctor Danwitz (1956) - Christa Hambach
  (1956) - Truus Dautzenberg
 Der Meineidbauer (1956) - Paula Roth
 Rütting in Glücksritter (1957) - Renate Bergmann
 And Lead Us Not Into Temptation (1957) - Frau Hudetz
  (1958) - Frau Römer
 The Cry of the Wild Geese (1961) - Amelia Gare
 Legend of a Gunfighter (1964) - Ann Bradley
 Die Herausforderung (1975, TV Movie) - Lisa Sander
 Auf dem Chimborazo (1977, TV Movie) - Dorothea
 Martha Jellneck (1988) - Martha Jellneck

References

External links

1918 births
1990 deaths
Austrian film actresses
Austrian stage actresses
Austrian television actresses
Best Actress German Film Award winners
People from Villach
20th-century Austrian actresses